Lamberto Giorgis (1932 – 30 August 2019) was an Italian football player and manager.

Playing career
Giorgis played for Taranto between 1953 and 1961, making a total of 206 appearances for the club in Serie B and Serie C. He later played for Modena and Carpi.

Coaching career
After retiring as a player, Giorgis became a coach, and managed a number of club sides including Lecce, Sampdoria, Foggia and Pisa.

References

External links
 

1932 births
2019 deaths
Italian footballers
Association football midfielders
Taranto F.C. 1927 players
Modena F.C. players
A.C. Carpi players
Serie B players
Serie C players
Italian football managers
U.S. Lecce managers
U.C. Sampdoria managers
Calcio Foggia 1920 managers
Pisa S.C. managers
A.C. Monza managers